Mr. Wilson's Cabinet of Wonder: Pronged Ants, Horned Humans, Mice on Toast, and Other Marvels of Jurassic Technology is a 1995 book by Lawrence Weschler primarily about the Museum of Jurassic Technology in Los Angeles, California, and, more broadly, the history and role of museums.

Contents
The book is divided into two sections, called Inhaling the Spore and Cerebral Growth. Inhaling the Spore focuses on the Museum of Jurassic Technology itself. The author relates his experiences with the museum and its creator, the titular David Hildebrand Wilson.

In Cerebral Growth Weschler goes into greater depth about Wonder Cabinets. "Cerebral growth" is also a pun, as one of the objects of the museum is a human horn.

Reception
Mr. Wilson's Cabinet of Wonder was a finalist for the National Book Critics Circle Award for nonfiction and the Pulitzer Prize for General Non-Fiction. In 2019, Dan Kois and Laura Miller of Slate ranked it one of the 50 best nonfiction works of the past quarter-century.

References

Editions
 (Paperback). Published by Random House.

American non-fiction books
Museum books
1995 books